Pseudozalissa is a monotypic moth genus of the family Erebidae. Its only species, Pseudozalissa bella, is found in New Guinea. Both the genus and species were first described by George Thomas Bethune-Baker in 1906.

References

Calpinae
Monotypic moth genera